Brandstätter is a German surname. Notable people with the surname include:
 Andreas Brandstätter (1959–2006), German diplomat
 Hanns Brandstätter (born 1949), Austrian fencer
 Helmut Brandstätter (born 1955), Austrian journalist, author and politician
 Horst Brandstätter (1933–2015), German entrepreneur, owner of Brandstätter Group
 Jim Brandstatter, American football player
 Karel Brandstätter (born 1915, date of death unknown), Czech rower
 Karin Brandstätter (born 1983), Austrian figure skater
 Kevin Brandstätter (born 1996), Austrian football player
 Maria Kuhnert-Brandstätter (1919–2011), Austrian pharmacist

See also 
 Brandstetter
 Branstetter
 Brandstätter Group, German toy company, headquartered in Zirndorf, Germany

German-language surnames